Life Starts Now (Swedish: Nu börjar livet) is a 1948 Swedish drama film directed by Gustaf Molander and starring Mai Zetterling, Georg Rydeberg and Wanda Rothgardt.

The film's sets were designed by the art director Nils Svenwall.

Main cast
 Mai Zetterling as Vera Ullman 
 Georg Rydeberg as Tore Gerhard, vicar 
 Wanda Rothgardt as Dorrit 
 Hugo Björne as Eliasson 
 Bengt Eklund as John Berg 
 Åke Grönberg as Berra 
 Ivar Kåge as Vicar 
 Jan Molander as Svenne 
 Sven-Eric Gamble as Plåtis

References

Bibliography
 Sundholm, John. Historical Dictionary of Scandinavian Cinema. Scarecrow Press, 2012.

External links

1948 films
Swedish drama films
Swedish black-and-white films
1948 drama films
1940s Swedish-language films
Films directed by Gustaf Molander
1940s Swedish films